Stendec is an electronica collaboration between Expanding label founders Ben Edwards (Benge) and Paul Merritt. The band's debut album, A Study of "And" was released on May 3, 2004.

Citations

External links
[ Stendec at the All Music Guide]

Electronica music groups